Lengyel means "Pole" in Hungarian. The word may refer to:
Lengyel, a village in Tolna County, Hungary
Lengyel (surname)
Lengyel culture, an archaeological culture